Frederiksen is a Danish patronymic surname meaning "son of Frederik". The Norwegian counterpart is Fredriksen and the Swedish is Fredriksson.

People
Axel Frederiksen (1894–1951),  Danish composer
Christian Frederiksen, Danish-born Norwegian sprint canoer 
Claus Hjort Frederiksen, Danish Minister of Finance
Dennis Frederiksen (1951–2014), American singer, the lead vocalist for Angel, Le Roux, and Toto  
Grete Frederiksen, Danish freestyle swimmer who competed in the 1936 Olympics
Heather Frederiksen, British swimmer
Helle Frederiksen, Danish triathlete
Henrik Frederiksen (born 1943/44), Danish businessman and car collector
Ib Frederiksen, Danish badminton player 
Ingeborg Frederiksen (1886–1976), Danish botanical illustrator
Ivan Frederiksen, Danish curler
Jan Frederiksen, Danish professional football defender
Johnny Frederiksen, Danish curler 
Kaj Frederiksen (1916–1991), Danish boxer who competed in the 1936 Olympics
Karolína Frederiksen (nee Pilařová, born 1981), Czech curler and curling coach
Katti Frederiksen (born 1982), Greenlandic writer, poet, linguist and politician
Kurt Frederiksen, Danish politician
Lars Frederiksen, guitarist and vocalist for the punk rock band Rancid
Marti Frederiksen, American musician, producer, and songwriter with Aerosmith 
Mette Frederiksen, Danish politician
Niels Frederiksen, Danish football coach
Søren Frederiksen (footballer born 1972), Danish footballer
Søren Frederiksen (footballer born 1989), Danish footballer
Suka K. Frederiksen (1965–2020), Greenlandic politician
Viggo Frederiksen (1916–1993), Danish boxer who competed in the 1936 Olympics

Other
Carl Fredricksen, fictional character from the animated movie Up
Frederiksen Industries, an amusement ride manufacturer based in Tampa, Florida specializing in Fun Slides
Lars Frederiksen and the Bastards (album), self-titled debut album by guitarist Lars Frederiksen

See also
Fredriksen 
Fredriksson

Danish-language surnames
Patronymic surnames
Surnames from given names